A medical abortion, also known as medication abortion, occurs when drugs (medication) are used to bring about an abortion. Medical abortions are an alternative to surgical abortions such as vacuum aspiration or dilation and curettage. Medical abortions are more common than surgical abortions in most places, including Europe, India, China, and the United States.

Medical abortions are typically performed by administering a two-drug combination:  mifepristone followed by misoprostol.  When mifepristone is not available, misoprostol alone may be used in some situations.

Medical abortion is both safe and effective throughout a range of gestational ages, including the second and third trimester. In the United States, the mortality rate for medical abortion is 14 times lower than the mortality rate for childbirth, and the rate of serious complications requiring hospitalization or blood transfusion is less than 0.4%. Medical abortion can be administered safely by the patient at home, without assistance, in the first trimester.  Starting with the second trimester, it is recommended to take the second drug in a clinic or provider's office.

Medical abortion should not be confused with emergency contraception, which typically involves drugs (such as Levonorgestrel or "Plan B") taken soon after intercourse to prevent a pregnancy from beginning.

Drug regimens

Less than 12 weeks' gestation 
For medical abortion up to 12 weeks' gestation, the recommended drug dosages are 200 milligrams of mifepristone by mouth,  followed one to two days later by 800 micrograms of misoprostol inside the cheek, vaginally, or under the tongue. The success rate of this drug combination  is 96.6% through 10 weeks' pregnancy.  

Misoprostol should be administered 24 to 48 hours after the mifepristone; taking the misoprostol before 24 hours have elapsed reduces the probability of success.  However, one study showed that the two drugs may be taken simultaneously with nearly the same efficacy.

For pregnancies after 9 weeks, two doses of misoprostol (the second drug) makes the treatment more effective. From 10 to 11 weeks of pregnancy, the National Abortion Federation suggests second dose of misoprostol (800 micrograms) four hours after the first dose.

After the patient takes mifepristone, they must also administer the misoprostol.  Failure to take the misoprostol may result in any of these outcomes:  the fetus may be terminated, but not fully expelled from the uterus (possibly accompanied by hemorrhaging) and may require surgical intervention to remove the fetus; or the pregnancy may be successfully aborted and expelled; or the pregnancy may continue with a healthy fetus. For those reasons, misoprostol should always be taken after the mifepristone.

If the pregnancy involves twins, a higher dosage of mifepristone may be recommended.

Self-administered medical abortion 
In the first trimester, self-administered medical abortion is available for patients who prefer to take the abortion drugs at home without direct medical supervision (in contrast to provider-administered medical abortion where the patient takes the second abortion drug in the presence of a trained healthcare provider).  Evidence from clinical trials indicates self-administered medical abortion is as effective as provider-administered abortion; however additional research is required to confirm that safety is equivalent.

The procedure used to administer the two drugs depends on specific drugs prescribed.  A typical procedure, for 200 mg mifepristone tablets, is:
 Take the mifepristone
 Take the misoprostol between 24 hours and 48 hours after the mifepristone
 The pregnancy (embryo and placenta) will be expelled through the vagina within 2 to 24 hours after taking misoprostol, so the patient should remain near toilet facilities at that time.  Cramps, nausea and bleeding may be experienced while the pregnancy is being expelled, and afterwards
 To avoid infection, the patient should not use tampons or engage in intercourse for 2 to 3 weeks
 The patient should contact their provider 7 to 14 days after the administration of mifepristone to confirm that complete termination of pregnancy has occurred and to evaluate the degree of bleeding

After 12 weeks' gestation 
Medical abortion is safe and effective in the second and third trimesters. The WHO recommends that medical abortions performed after 12 weeks' gestation be supervised by a generalist medical practitioner or specialist medical practitioner (in contrast to first trimester, where the patient may safely take the drugs at home without supervision).

For medical abortion after 12 weeks' gestation, the WHO recommends 200 mg of mifepristone by mouth followed one to two days later by repeat doses of 400 μg misoprostol under the tongue, inside the cheek, or in the vagina. Misoprostol should be taken every 3 hours until successful abortion is achieved, the mean time to abortion after starting misoprostol is 6–8 hours, and approximately 94% will abort within 24 hours after starting misoprostol. When mifepristone is not available, misoprostol may still be used though the mean time to abortion after starting misoprostol will be extended compared to regimens using mifepristone followed by misoprostol.

Alternative drug combinations
The mifepristone-misoprostol combination is, by far, the most recommended drug regimen for medical abortions, but other drug combinations are available.

Misoprostol alone, without mifepristone, may be used in some circumstances for medical abortion, and has even been demonstrated to be successful in the second trimester.  Misoprostol is more commonly available than mifepristone, and is easier to store and administer, so misoprostol without mifepristone may be suggested by the provider if mifepristone is not available. If misoprostol is used without mifepristone, the WHO recommends 800 μg of misoprostol inside the cheek, under the tongue, or in the vagina. The success rate of misoprostol alone for terminating pregnancy (93%) is nearly the same as the mifepristone-misoprostol combination (96%).  However, 15% of the women using misoprostol alone required a surgical follow-up procedure, which is significantly more than the  mifepristone-misoprostol combination.

A rarely used drug combination for uterine pregnancies is methotrexate-misoprostol, which is typically reserved for ectopic pregnancies.  Methotrexate is given either orally or intramuscularly, followed by vaginal misoprostol 3–5 days later. The methotrexate combination is available through 63 days. The WHO authorizes the methotrexate-misoprostol combination but recommends the mifepristone combination because methotrexate may be teratogenic to the embryo in cases of incomplete abortion.  The methotrexate-misoprostol combination is considered more effective than misoprostol alone.

Access to medical abortion 
Both drugsmifepristone and misoprostolare no longer covered by drug patents, and hence are available as generic drugs.

Over-the-counter availability
The requirements for a prescription vary widely between countries. Many countries make the medical abortion drugs available over the counter, without a prescription, such as China, India, and others.  Other countries require a prescription (Canada, most of Western Europe, the United States, and others).  Some countries require a prescription but are lax about enforcing that requirement (Russia, Brazil, and others).

Telehealth access
Telehealth includes access to medical services that the person can perform at home, without in-person visits to clinic or provider offices. People who have used telehealth report being satisfied with the access it provides to abortion services. However, those who might need the service the most (those who are incarcerated, unhoused, or live on low income) are often inhibited from accessing it.

Telehealth options for people in the U.S. seeking medical abortion include: Aid Access, Plan C, Hey Jane, Choix, Just the Pill, carafem, and Abortion on Demand.

Clinic-to-clinic access
In this model, a provider communicates with a patient located at another site using clinic-to-clinic videoconferencing to provide medication abortion. This was introduced by Planned Parenthood of the Heartland in Iowa to allow a patient at one health facility to communicate via secure video with a health provider at another facility. This model has expanded to other Planned Parenthoods in multiple states as well other clinics providing abortion care.

Direct-to-patient access
The direct-to-patient model allows for medication abortion to be provided without an in-person clinic visit. Instead of an in-person clinic visit, the patient receives counseling and instruction from the abortion provider via videoconference. The patient can be at any location, including their home. The medications necessary for the abortion are mailed directly to the patient. This is a model, called TelAbortion or no-test medication abortion (formerly no-touch medication abortion), being piloted and studied by Gynuity Health Projects, with special approval from the U.S. Food and Drug Administration (FDA). This model has been shown to be safe, effective, efficient, and satisfactory. Complete abortion can be confirmed via telephone-based assessment.

In the United States

In the U.S., prescriptions for mifepristone may be filled by any pharmacy - online or brick-and-mortar - that has obtained a special certification.  This regulation was provisionally implemented in Dec 2021, and was finalized by the FDA in January 2023.
 
From 2011 until 2021, a patient was required to visit a healthcare provider in-person (at a clinic or office) and receive mifepristone directly from the provider.  The requirement to visit a clinic to receive the drug was removed by the FDA in December 2021, during the COVID-19 pandemic. Under the new rules, the prescription may be obtained via telehealth (phone calls or video conferencing with a healthcare provider), and then filled at any certified pharmacy. At the same time the FDA removed the requirement for an in-person visit, they added a requirement that dispensing pharmacies be "certified", which requires the pharmacy to have special permission to dispense the drugsa requirement the FDA imposes on only 40 drugs out of more than 19,000 it manages.

The second drug used in medical abortion, misoprostol, is most commonly used for treating ulcers, and was never subject to the in-person dispensing constraints of mifepristone, and was always available from pharmacies with a prescription.

The FDA does not authorize the use of mifepristone for medical abortion after 70 days, unlike most other countries, which authorize medical abortion into the second trimester and even the third trimester.

Some states have passed laws that prohibit providers from examining the patient via phone or video conferencing, and instead require the patient to make an in-person visit to the provider to get the prescription.

In most states, abortion drugs may be sent from a pharmacy to the patient via mail, but certain states have passed laws making that illegal, and requiring the drugs to be obtained from a pharmacy or provider in-person.

Interest in abortion medications in the United States reached record highs in 2022, after the Supreme Court of the United States draft Dobbs v. Jackson Women's Health Organization ruling that would overturn Roe v. Wade was leaked online. Interest was higher in states with more restrictions on access to abortion. Pro-choice activists in the U.S. were exploring ways to make medical abortion more available, particularly in states where it is subject to limitations, with social media resources being utilized for this purpose.

In March 2023, Governor Mark Gordon of Wyoming  signed a bill outlawing the use of abortion pills in the state, making it the first US state to do so. The new legislation, which will go into effect on July 1, 2023, criminalizes the "prescription, dispensation, distribution, sale, or use of any drug" for the purpose of obtaining or performing an abortion. Those who violate the law, excluding the pregnant individual, may be charged with a misdemeanor and could face a $9,000 fine and up to six months in prison. Abortion providers are expected to challenge the new law in court.

Contraindications

Contraindications to mifepristone are inherited porphyria, chronic adrenal failure, and ectopic pregnancy. Some consider an intrauterine device in place to be a contraindication as well. A previous allergic reaction to mifepristone or misoprostol is also a contraindication.

Many studies excluded women with severe medical problems such as heart and liver disease or severe anemia. Caution is required in a range of circumstances including:
 long-term corticosteroid use;
 bleeding disorder;
 severe anemia

In some cases, it may be appropriate to refer people with preexisting medical conditions to a hospital-based abortion provider.

Adverse effects
Most women will have cramping and bleeding heavier than a menstrual period.    Other adverse effects include nausea, vomiting, fever, chills, diarrhea, and headache.   Misoprostol taken vaginally tends to have fewer gastrointestinal side effects. Nonsteroidal antiinflammatory medications such as ibuprofen reduce pain with medication abortion.

Complications 
Symptoms that require immediate medical attention:
 Heavy bleeding (enough blood to soak through four sanitary pads in 2 hours)
 Abdominal pain, nausea, vomiting, diarrhea, fever for more than 24 hours after taking mifepristone

Complications under 10 weeks' pregnancy are rare; according to two large reviews, bleeding requiring a blood transfusion occurred in 0.03–0.6% of women and serious infection in 0.01–0.5%. Because infection is rare after medication abortion, the American College of Obstetricians and Gynecologists, The Society of Family Planning, and the NAF do not recommend use of routine antibiotics. A few rare cases of deaths from clostridial toxic shock syndrome have occurred following medical abortions.

A 2013 systematic review which included 45,000 women who used the 200 mg mifeprestone followed by misoprostol combination found that less than 0.4% had serious complications requiring hospitalization (0.3%) and/or blood transfusion (0.1%).

Management of bleeding
Vaginal bleeding generally diminishes gradually over about two weeks after a medical abortion, but in individual cases spotting can last up to 45 days. If the woman is well, neither prolonged bleeding nor the presence of tissue in the uterus (as detected by obstetric ultrasonography) is an indication for surgical intervention (that is, vacuum aspiration or dilation and curettage). Remaining products of conception will be expelled during subsequent vaginal bleeding. Still, surgical intervention may be carried out on the woman's request, if the bleeding is heavy or prolonged, or causes anemia, or if there is evidence of endometritis.

Although medical abortion is associated with more bleeding than surgical abortion, overall bleeding for the two methods is minimal and not clinically different. In a large-scale prospective trial published in 1992 of more than 16,000 women undergoing medical abortion using mifepristone with varying doses of gemeprost or sulprostone, only 0.1% had hemorrhage requiring a blood transfusion. It is often advised to contact a health care provider if there is bleeding to such degree that more than two pads are soaked per hour for two consecutive hours.

Safety
Medical abortion is safe even into the second and third trimesters.   

In the United States, an FDA report states that of the 3.7 million women who have had a medication abortion between 2000 and 2018, 24 died afterward, with 11 of those deaths likely unrelated to the abortion, including drug overdoses, homicides, and a suicide. If the deaths likely unrelated to the abortion are not included, then the mortality rate for medication abortion is half the mortality rate of abortion overall. Including all 24 deaths, the data shows that (in the US) the mortality rate for medication abortion is equivalent to abortion overall, which is 14 times lower than the mortality rate for childbirth, and also lower than the mortality rate for Penicillin and Viagra.

Pharmacology

Mifepristone blocks the hormone progesterone, causing the lining of the uterus to thin and preventing the embryo from staying implanted and growing. Methotrexate, which is sometimes used instead of mifepristone, stops the cytotrophoblastic tissue from growing and becoming a functional placenta. Misoprostol, a synthetic prostaglandin, causes the uterus to contract and expel the embryo through the vagina.

Prevalence

A Guttmacher Institute survey of all known abortion providers in the U.S. found that medical abortions accounted for 54% of all abortions in 2020. This count did not include self-induced abortions.

At Planned Parenthood clinics in the U.S., medical abortions accounted for 32% of first trimester abortions in 2008, 35% of all abortions in 2010 and 43% of all abortions in 2014.

In 2009, medical abortion regimens using mifepristone in combination with a prostaglandin analog were the most common methods used to induce second-trimester abortions in Canada, most of Europe, China and India; in contrast to the U.S., where 96% of second-trimester abortions were performed surgically by dilation and evacuation.

History
Swedish researchers began testing potential abortifacients in 1965. In 1968, the Swedish physician Lars Engström published a paper on a clinical trial, conducted at the women's clinic of Karolinska Hospital in Stockholm, of the compound F6103 on pregnant Swedish women with the aim of inducing abortion. It was the first clinical trial of an abortion pill to be conducted in Sweden. The paper, originally titled The Swedish Abortion Pill, was renamed to The Swedish Postconception Pill, due to the small number of induced abortions that occurred in the trial population. After these efforts were largely unsuccessful with F6103, the same researchers attempted to find an abortion pill with prostaglandins, capitalizing on the number of well-established prostaglandin scientists working in Sweden at the time; they were eventually awarded the 1982 Nobel Prize in Physiology for their work.

Medical abortion became a successful alternative method of abortion with the availability of prostaglandin analogs in the 1970s and the antiprogestogen mifepristone (also known as RU-486) in the 1980s. Mifepristone was first approved for use in 1998 in China and France.  The drugs were approved for abortions in 2000 in U.S., but only through 49 days gestation. In 2016, the U.S. FDA updated mifepristone's label to support usage through 70 days gestation.

Society and culture
The WHO affirms that laws and policies should support people's access to evidence-based medically approved care, including medical abortion.

"Reversal" controversy

Some anti-abortion groups claim that patients who change their mind about the abortion after taking mifepristone can "reverse" the abortion by administering progesterone (and not administering misoprostol). As of 2022, there is no scientifically rigorous evidence that the effects of mifepristone can be reversed this way. Even so, several states in the U.S. require providers of non-surgical abortion who use mifepristone to tell patients that reversal is an option. In 2019, researchers initiated a small trial of the so-called "reversal" regimen using mifepristone followed by progesterone or placebo. The study was halted after 12 women enrolled and three experienced severe vaginal bleeding. The results raise serious safety concerns about using mifepristone without follow-up misoprostol.

Cost
In the U.S. in 2009, the typical price charged for a medical abortion up to 9 weeks' gestation was $490, four percent higher than the $470 typical price charged for a surgical abortion at 10 weeks' gestation. In the U.S. in 2008, 57% of women who had abortions paid for them out of pocket.

In April 2013, the Australian government commenced an evaluation process to decide whether to list mifepristone (RU486) and misoprostol on the country's Pharmaceutical Benefits Scheme (PBS). If the listing is approved by the Health Minister Tanya Plibersek and the federal government, the drugs will become more accessible due to a dramatic reduction in retail price—the cost would be reduced from between AU$300 and AU$800, to AU$12 (subsidised rate for concession card holders) or AU$35.   On 30 June 2013, the Australian Minister for Health, the Hon. Tanya Plibersek MP, announced that the Australian Government had approved the listing of mifepristone and misoprostol on the PBS for medical termination in early pregnancy consistent with the recommendation of the Pharmaceutical Benefits Advisory Committee. These listings on the PBS commenced on 1 August 2013.

References

External links 
  Warning: link gives only the first page of the report; the rest is listed as "out of print"
 
 
 WHO "Safe Abortion: Technical and Policy Guidance for Health Systems". Geneva 2012. Second edition. ISBN 978 92 4 154843 4
 National Abortion Federation Clinical Policy Guidelines for abortion

Methods of abortion
Fertility